Peugeot Hoggar may also refer to:

Peugeot Hoggar (coupé utility)
Peugeot Hoggar (concept)